Culture 21, also known as Agenda 21 for culture, is a program for cultural governance developed in 2002–2004 and organized by United Cities and Local Governments.

Part of the program's premise is to add culture as a fourth conceptual pillar of sustainable development in governance, the historical three pillars of which are the environment, social inclusion, and economics.

History 
Agenda 21 is an agenda for sustainable development in the 21st century, approved by United Nations members at the Rio de Janeiro Earth Summit in 1992. The original Agenda 21 did not discuss culture in great depth. It did include a section (Chapter 28) known as "Local Agenda 21" which called for local governments to adopt action plans and to collaborate with international organizations; a deliberative process which itself would "increase household awareness of sustainable development issues". While the ecological dimension of Local Agenda 21 was paramount at first, cities in the following years have incorporated cultural development into their outlook on sustainable development. In 1998, the World Bank and UNESCO jointly endorsed the inclusion of culture in the sustainable development strategy.

In September 2002, the first World Public Meeting on Culture, held in Porto Alegre, resolved to create guidelines for local cultural policies. A final document was approved on 8 May 2004 in Barcelona, and on 15 September it was submitted to UN-HABITAT and UNESCO. In October 2004 the United Cities and Local Governments World Council met in Sao Paulo, and officially adopted the Agenda 21 for Culture as a reference document, to be managed and coordinated by the UCLG.

By 2010, over 400 governments and organizations had jointed Agenda 21 for culture in some way. By 2015 membership exceeded 500.

Contents 
The Agenda 21 for culture has 67 articles, divided into three sections: principles, undertakings, and recommendations. The "Principles" include core values such as cultural diversity and human rights, as well as perspectives on which actors will implement the agenda. Cities are envisioned as primary sites for cultural production and governance, as well as places where cultural policy is necessary for harmonious coexistence. Culture itself is described as an essential part of constructing citizenship for people of all ages. Participation in culture takes place through channels including internet, public spaces, and work.

The "Undertakings" section encourages policies which support cultural development and expand access to culture without prejudice. It specifically mentions books, internet, museums, and tourism as vectors for culture. It calls for decentralized but funded cultural policies; multilateral cooperation between cultural institutions, NGOs, and governments; and popularization of scientific technical culture. It advocates the right of freedom of speech, the moral rights of authors and artists, and the development of legal systems for historic preservation. The recommendations section addresses local and national governments, regional blocs, and international organizations, offering advice for how each of them can implement this agenda.

Organization and initiatives 
In the UCLG, the Agenda 21 for culture is managed by the Committee on culture of the world organization United Cities and Local Governments (UCLG). The Committee on culture is co-chaired by Buenos Aires and the City of Mexico and vice-chaired by Angers, Barcelona, Belo Horizonte, Bilbao, Bogotá, Jeju, Paris and Porto Alegre since 2016. Between 2012 and 2015, the UCLG Committee on Culture was chaired by the Lille-Métropole and co-chaired by Buenos Aires, México DF and Montreal, and the cities of Angers, Barcelona and Milan were Vice-Presidents and three other cities (one from Africa, one from Middle East/Asia and one from Asia/Pacific) to join the Board as Vice-Presidents. Before 2012, the Committee on culture was chaired by Barcelona city council, and Stockholm, Lille, Buenos Aires and Montreal councils are its vice presidents.

Other organizations promoting Agenda 21 for culture include UNESCO and the Spanish Agency for International Development Cooperation (AECID).

In 2009–2010, UCLG, with AECID and the Barcelona City Council, created the Fund for Local Cultural Governance, to advance the implementation of the Agenda 21 for culture in African, Mediterranean and Latin American cities.

In 2009–2013 UNESCO and the AECID developed "Culture for Development Indicators" (CDIS), an "advocacy and policy" toll for assessing cultural development in 22 areas within 7 categories.

Moreover, the UCLG Committee on Culture has worked to ensure that culture is explicitly integrated into the development programmes of the United Nations which aim to achieve the Millennium Development Goals. After some awareness-raising actions during the Millennium Development Goals Summit, the UN General Assembly approved the final document of the Summit that mentions culture as an important dimension of development.

Campaign for the Sustainable Development Goals 

UNESCO and UCLG have advocated for inclusion of culture in the 2015 Sustainable Development Goals (SDGs) and have continued to promote this outlook.

Concretely, in the years before the adoption of the SDGs several global networks campaigned for the inclusion of one specific goal devoted to culture, or for the integration of cultural aspects across the SDGs. IFACCA, IFCCD, Agenda 21 for culture (UCLG), Culture Action Europe, Arterial Network, IMC - International Music Council, ICOMOS, IFLA and the Latin American Network of Arts for Social Transformation lead this campaign, which used the banner 'The Future We Want Includes Culture' and was also known as the #culture2015goal campaign.

Between 2013 and 2015, when the SDGs were adopted, a manifesto, a declaration on the inclusion of culture in the 2030 Agenda, a proposal of possible indicators for measuring the cultural aspects of the SDGs, and an assessment of the final 2030 Agenda, were produced.

Contribution to the New Urban Agenda 

The Committee on culture of UCLG participated in Habitat III, the United Nations Conference on Housing and Sustainable Urban Development, whose primary goal and outcome was the adoption of the New Urban Agenda (NUA). The conference took place in Quito, Ecuador, from 17 – 20 October 2016, and the New Urban Agenda was endorsed by the United Nations General Assembly on 23 December 2016

Before the conference, the Committee has formulated a set of comments to the issue paper on "Urban Culture and Heritage", which was one of the 22 issue papers published by the UN Task Force in preparation for the conference. The Committee welcomed the publication of this paper and believes that the New Urban Agenda should provide details of a culture-based approach to local sustainable development.

Publications 

Since 2006, in the framework of its research tasks, the Committee on culture of UCLG (Agenda 21 for Culture) has published the following reports:
Local policies for cultural diversity
Culture, local governments and Millennium Development Goals
Agenda 21 for culture in France. State of affairs and outlook
Culture and sustainable development: examples of institutional innovation and proposal of a new cultural policy profile
Cities, cultures and developments. A report that marks the fifth anniversary of Agenda 21 for culture
Rio+20 and culture. Advocating for Culture as a Pillar of Sustainability
Cultural Heritage and Sustainable Development
Operationalising culture in the sustainable development of cities
Why must culture be at the heart of sustainable urban development?

Moreover, two briefings providing information and facilitating discussion on relevant issues regarding culture (Cities, Refugees and Culture: Briefing and Culture, Climate Change and Sustainable Development: Briefing) and the study Culture, Cities and Identity in Europe, jointly with Culture Action Europe, have been prepared.

Culture and development 

The Agenda 21 for culture is a tool to enhance the role of culture in urban policies and also a tool to make cultural issues the fourth pillar of sustainable development.

"Sustainability" in culture refers not only to the preservation of cultural heritage but also to incorporating the sustainable development mentality into everyday life.

The extensive work and activism undertaken by the Agenda 100 for culture led the UCLG Executive Bureau to head the preparation of the policy statement document "Culture: the Fourth Pillar of Sustainable Development", approved on 17 November 2010 in the framework of the World Summit of Local and Regional Leaders – 3rd UCLG World Congress, held in Mexico City. This document opens a new perspective and points to the relationship between culture and sustainable development through a dual approach: developing a solid cultural policy and advocating a cultural dimension in all public policies.

Participation 
Quebec has endorsed the Agenda 21 for culture model and released a development plan along these lines. Montreal has ratified the agenda and undertaken various actions including library restoration and the creation of new cultural institutions, including "Design Montréal". An NGO called "Culture Montréal" has formed to promote development of and access to culture. Montreal has been designated a "UNESCO City of design".

The Moroccan city Essaouira, according to mayor Asma Chaabi, has been incorporating culture into its implementation of Local Agenda 21 since the 1990s. She writes in the five-year review of Agenda 21 for culture that Essaouira has succeeded in its historic preservation goals through cooperation with the national ministry of culture and with UNESCO.

See also
 Culture
 Cultural bias
 Cultural rights
 Culture theory
 Culture war
 Cultural dissonance
 Cultural imperialism

References

Citations

Sources 

 Pascual, Jordi, ed. Cities, cultures and developments: A report that marks the fifth anniversary of Agenda 21 for culture; United Cities and Local Governments, 15 October 2009.

External links 
 Official website
UCLG. Local Policies for Cultural Diversity
 UCLG. Culture, Local Governments and Millennium Development Goals
 UCLG. Culture and Sustainable Development: Examples of Institutional Innovation and Proposal of a New Cultural Policy Profile
 UCLG. Cities, Cultures and Developments. A Report that Marks the Fifth Anniversary of the Agenda 21 for Culture
 Pascual, Jordi. Cultural Policies, Human Development and Institutional Innovation: or Why We Need an Agenda 21 for culture
 Montréal, cultural metropolis
Lille City Council
Buenos Aires City Council

Political culture